"I Juswannachill" is a song by American emcee Large Professor, released on October 29, 1996, as the second single from his debut album The LP; the album was shelved by Geffen Records before eventually being released in 2009. The song contains a sample of "Enchanted Lady" by Milt Jackson.

Track listing

Charts

References

1995 songs
1996 singles
Geffen Records singles
Large Professor songs
Song recordings produced by Large Professor
Songs written by Large Professor